Seldiren is a village in Samandağı district of Hatay Province, Turkey. The population of the village was 512  as of 2012. The village was founded in the early 1800s by people from north of Hatay Province. The main economic activity is agriculture and forestry.

References

Villages in Hatay Province
Samandağ District